Pleşi may refer to several villages in Romania:

 Pleşi, a village in Săsciori Commune, Alba County
 Pleşi, a village in Bisoca Commune, Buzău County

and to:
 Plesi, a village in Bosnia and Herzegovina

See also 
 Pleșa (disambiguation)
 Pleașa (disambiguation)
 Pleșoiu (disambiguation)